Chiang Been-huang is a Taiwanese politician. He served as the Minister of Health and Welfare from 22 October 2014 to 20 May 2016.

Early life
Chiang obtained his bachelor's degree in biology from Fu-Jen Catholic University in 1975. He continued his study in meat science at the doctoral degree from the University of Illinois at Urbana–Champaign in the United States and graduated with a master's degree in 1979. He obtained his doctoral degree in food science from the same university in 1983.

Early career
He had been a lecturer and associate professor of the Institute of Food Science and Technology at National Taiwan University (NTU) in 1983-1988 and has become a professor since then. He became the director of the institute in 1991-1997 and also the dean of the College of Bioresources and Agriculture of NTU in 2004–2005.

Minister without Portfolio
Chiang was named the Minister without Portfolio in February 2014 and took office a month later. He was assigned to oversee the health and welfare-related affairs, including disease prevention and control, medicine, sanitation and national food safety policies.

Minister of Health and Welfare

Ministry appointment
On 17 October 2014, the Executive Yuan announced the appointment of Chiang to the post of Minister of Health and Welfare after the resignation of Chiu Wen-ta due to the food scandal involving adulterated cooking oil in early September 2014. Upon his appointment, Chiang said that he would give all of his best while serving the public and that he felt confident to solve the ongoing oil scandal in Taiwan within a month to gain public trust in Taiwanese food safety. Chiang has four policies in dealing with the oil scandal, which are to reinforce the management of food sources, to set up a three-level quality control system, to utilize information communication technology in integrating food management and to diversify the management of different oil products. Chiang was sworn in on 22 October 2014.

See also
 Executive Yuan

References

1952 births
Living people
Fu Jen Catholic University alumni
Academic staff of the National Taiwan University
University of Illinois College of Agriculture, Consumer, and Environmental Sciences alumni
Food scientists
Taiwanese Ministers of Health and Welfare